Mohamed Essam may refer to:
 Mohamed Essam (Egyptian footballer) (born 1994)
 Mohammed Essam (Qatari footballer) (born 2000)
 Mohamed Essam (fencer) (born 1994), Egyptian fencer

See also
 Mohamed Essam Khaled, Egyptian basketball player